Gilbert Reaney (11 January 1924 – 22 March 2008) was an English musicologist who specialized in medieval and Renaissance music, theory and literature. Described as "one of the most prolific and influential musicologists of the past century", Reaney made significant contributions to his fields of expertise, particularly on the life and works of Guillaume de Machaut, as well as medieval music theory.

Born in Sheffield, Reaney studied French and music at the University of Sheffield, where he received three degrees: a Bachelor of Arts, Bachelor of Music and Master of Arts. For the latter, he wrote a dissertation on the formes fixes of Machaut, inaugurating a life-long scholarly interest in the composer. After stints at the Universities of Reading, Birmingham, and Hamburg he became an associate professor at the University of California, Los Angeles. He was a Professor of Music there from 1963 until his retirement in 1997. A long-time associate of the American Institute of Musicology, he was associate editor (1955–1992) of their journal, Musica Disciplina, under Armen Carapetyan, and then co-editor (1992–2008) with Frank A. D'Accone.

Among Reaney's notable publications are the book  for the Oxford Studies of Composers series; new editions on various early music composers; major new editions of works by music theorists Franco of Cologne, Philippe de Vitry and John Hothby; and at least 34 articles on a variety of subjects for The New Grove Dictionary of Music and Musicians and the subsequent Grove Music Online.

Early life and education
Gilbert Reaney was born in Sheffield, England on 11 January 1924; his father was an amateur musician. In 1942 he began studying music and French at the University of Sheffield. He halted his studies after only a year, enlisting in the British army and often performing at "camp concerts" with pieces such as Richard Addinsell's Warsaw Concerto. Resuming his education in 1946, he received both a Bachelor of Arts (1948) and a Bachelor of Music (1951) from the University of Sheffield. Also in 1951, he took a Master of Arts, with a dissertation on the formes fixes (rondeaus, virelais and ballades) of Guillaume de Machaut. His studies brought him to the Sorbonne in Paris, where—on a grant from the French government—he studied the Roman de Fauvel manuscript, a source of ars nova medieval music, literature and art. The music historian Tess Knighton notes that Reaney did not write a doctoral dissertation; this is standard to be promoted as a Professor of Music in the 21st-century, but was not at the time.

Career

Organizations and institutions
Returning to England, Reaney was research fellow at the University of Reading (from 1953 to 1956) and then the University of Birmingham (1956 to 1959). While at Reading and Birmingham, Reaney founded and regularly directed the London Medieval Group, an early music ensemble which he regularly joined on tour in both the United Kingdom and Continental Europe. At this time he also appeared on various programmes on BBC Radio 3, giving frequent talks on early music. Following a brief stint as visiting professor at the University of Hamburg (1959–1960), he taught at the University of California, Los Angeles (UCLA), as an associate professor in 1961. By the 1960s, Reany had become an established authority on early music. He was the first recipient of the Dent medal (1961), an annual award for musicology offered by the Royal Musical Association (named for Edward Joseph Dent). Reany became a Professor of Music at UCLA in 1963 and remained so until his retirement in 1997, at which point he was made an emeritus professor.

Reaney was long associated with the American Institute of Musicology (AIM). Knighton noted that during the mid 20th-century many English scholars of early music were closely associated with organizations in the United States, as they were the most prominent and developed in the field. AIM's music journal Musica Disciplina was created in 1945, and in 1952 published two of Reaney's articles on Machaut. He continued contributing articles to the journal throughout the 1950s, chiefly on ars nova topics. In 1955, the institute's founder and editor of Musica Disciplina, Armen Carapetyan, invited Reaney to become the associate editor of the journal. After Carapetyan's death in 1992, Reaney became co-editor of Musica Disciplina with his UCLA colleague Frank A. D'Accone.

Scholarship
A prolific, influential and frequently cited scholar, Reaney wrote books, catalogues, articles and editions. Musicologist Ursula Günther characterizes his output as having a "characteristic objectivity, clarity of argument, a concise style and thorough knowledge of widely varying subjects". His research spanned a variety of topics in medieval and Renaissance music, theory and literature. His most important contributions, however, are on the life and works of Machaut, as well as medieval music theory. Beginning with his 1952 dissertation, Reaney published a variety of scholarship on the Machaut. This included studies on Machaut's formes fixes, lais, performance, and numerous articles in encyclopedias such as Encyclopédie de la musique and Encyclopaedia Britannica. By way of an interdisciplinary approach of both music and literature, he developed new theories on the performance of how medieval musicians performed Machaut's music, influencing the practices of early music groups such as Gothic Voices led by Christopher Page.

A prominent scholar on medieval music theory, by 1966 Reaney was the general editor for AIM's Corpus scriptorum de musica (CSM), which involved research on at least ten modern editions of medieval manuscripts, including new publications of music theory works by Franco of Cologne and Philippe de Vitry. In particular, the 1974 edition of Franco's  influential Ars cantus mensurabilis by Reaney and André Gilles remains the standard critical edition. Also in 1966, Reaney became the editor for the Répertoire International des Sources Musicales's series of early music manuscripts. The latter series, which Reaney edited until 1969, was characterized by Knighton as "the bible for scholars of medieval music". Other theorists who Reaney published modern editions on include John Hothby.

Personal life
Reaney never married; he claimed, in the words of the obituarist John T. Good, "no wife would want a husband so constantly away from home". Good also described him as a fine pianist with a substantial repertoire. He died in Reading, Berkshire at the age of 84 on 22 March 2008.

Selected publications

Books

Editions

Articles

Others
 
 
 
 
 — — in

Grove articles
Grove Music Online. Oxford, England: Oxford University Press. 2001

References

Sources

External links
 
 Programs involving Gilbert Reaney at BBC Radio 3

2008 deaths
20th-century musicologists
21st-century musicologists
Machaut scholars
1924 births